David Ferrer defeated Nicolás Almagro 6–1, 6–2 to win the 2007 Swedish Open singles event.

Seeds

Draw

Finals

Section 1

Section 2

External links
 Main draw
 Qualifying draw

Singles